Felicia josephinae is a roughly hairy annual herbaceous plant of  high, that is assigned to the family Asteraceae. It branches near its base, and has few leaves along its stems. The lower leaves are set oppositely, inverted lance-shaped, relatively large at 3–7 cm (1½–2¾ in) long and ⅔–1¼ cm (¼–½ in) wide, and soon withering, while the higher ones are smaller and relatively narrower. Flowers can be found in September and October. The species is an endemic species that can only be found in a small area along the west coast of the Western Cape province of South Africa.

Description 
The stems and leaves are prickly due to short and long hairs that each consist of several cells, mixed with glands on short stalks in the upper parts of the stems. The lower leaves are set oppositely, are inverted lance-shaped, relatively large at 3–7 cm (1½–2¾ in) long and ⅔–1¼ cm (¼–½ in) wide, have few prickly hairs and soon wither. The higher leaves are narrower, lance- to line-shaped, mostly alternately set, and prickly due to long and short hairs.

The heads contain both female ray and bisexual and male disc florets (so-called heterogamous capitula). The communal base (or receptacle) on which the individual florets are implanted is flat, deeply pitted, and lacks receptacular bracts (or palea) at the foot of the florets.

At the base of each ray floret is a narrowly elliptic ovary with hairs pressed to its surface. There is no pappus. The one-seeded, indehiscent, dry fruit (called cypsela) is flattened oval in shape, 2½–3 mm (0.10–0.12 in) long and about 1½ mm (0.06 in) in diameter, with thickened margins, its surfaces and margins being covered with pale brown hairs pressed against its surface. The fourteen or fifteen deep purple disc florets are bisexual, but those in the center of the head do not develop seed. The tube has glandular hairs, is cylinder-shaped, 2½–3 mm long, widening a bit towards the upper end, where it splits into five back-curving triangular lobes of about 1 mm long and ¾ mm wide at its base, with thickened margins. Like in all Asteraceae, the five anthers have merged into a hollow tube through which the style grows with the floret opens, while gathering the pollen on its shaft. The anthers produce cream-coloured pollen, are themselves deep blue, about 2 mm long, including the oval, slightly keeled appendage at the top, while the base is blunt without an appendage. The ovary under the tube florets are narrowly elliptic, also with hairs pressed against its surface. In the central florets the style ends in triangular grainy branches. The cypselas are identical to those of the ray florets.

Differences with related species 
Most Felicia  species have a yellow disc, and blue, purple or pink, rarely white or yellow ray florets. F. josephinae, F. heterophylla and a form of F. amoena subsp. latifolia have deep purple disc florets. From these two taxa, F. josephinae differs by its broad creamy ray florets, which are more narrow and purple in F. heterophylla and narrower and blue in F. amoena subsp. latifolia.

Taxonomy 
As far as known, Felicia josephinae was first collected, between Clanwilliam and Elands Bay, in September 1933, by poet, medical doctor and plant hunter C. Louis Leipoldt. Further specimens were collected from a small stretch along the coast between Elands Bay and Lambert's Bay. These finds were either considered a new, unnamed species or, tentatively as some variation of Chareis heterophylla (currently Felicia heterophylla), with which it shares the deep purple colour of the disc florets, but from which it differs in having whitish ligulate florets instead of medium bluish purple. Somehow Jürke Grau, who revised the genus Felicia in 1973, hasn't come across any of the collections of this species. It was described by John Charles Manning and Peter Goldblatt only in 2002, who named it after South African botanist and Asteraceae specialist Josephine Beyers. Synonyms have not been recorded. F. josephinae has been assigned to the section Neodetris.

 Distribution, habitat and ecology Felicia josephinae only occurs in a small area on the west coast of the Western Cape province of South Africa between Lambert's Bay in the north, Elands Bay in the south, and the Sandberg, east of Leipoldtville. It grows on dunes and hills in a vegetation type called Strandveld Succulent Karoo, which occurs on chalky sands in the coastal plain, dominated by sparse shrubs, in particular Salvia lanceolata, skilpadbessie bos Muraltia spinosa, and several succulent Euphorbia species. Many annuals appear seasonally between the shrubs in the open spaces, including many Scrophulariaceae such as Alonsoa unilabiata, Hemimeris racemosa, Lyperia tristis, Nemesia affinis and N. bicomis, and the daisies Arctotis hirsuta, Dimorphotheca pluvialis and Trichogyne verticillata. F. josephinae is restricted to the very southern part of the Strandveld Succulent Karoo, with shallow sands overlying more compact sandstone-derived substrates. This species grows in an area in which the rains fall almost exclusively during the winter. The seeds germinate at the start of the rains in the autumn and are ready to flower in spring.

 Conservation Felicia josephinae'' is known from eight locations and considered a vulnerable species because of its declining population, which is seriously threatened by loss of habitat due to ongoing expansion of rooibos and potato cultivation and overgrazing.

References

External links 
 photos on iNaturalist

josephinae
Endemic flora of South Africa
Plants described in 2002
Taxa named by John Charles Manning
Taxa named by Peter Goldblatt